The Navy Cross is the United States Naval Service's second-highest military decoration awarded for sailors and marines who distinguish themselves for extraordinary heroism in combat with an armed enemy force. The medal is equivalent to the Army's Distinguished Service Cross, the Air and Space Forces' Air Force Cross, and the Coast Guard Cross.

The Navy Cross is bestowed by the Secretary of the Navy and may also be awarded to members of the other armed services, and to foreign military personnel while serving with the U.S. Naval Service. The Navy Cross was established by Act of Congress (Public Law 65-253) and approved on February 4, 1919.

History
The Navy Cross was instituted in part due to the entrance of the United States into World War I. Many European nations had the custom of decorating heroes from other nations, but the Medal of Honor was the sole U.S. award for valor at the time. The Army instituted the Distinguished Service Cross and Distinguished Service Medal in 1918, while the Navy followed suit in 1919, retroactive to 6 April 1917. Originally, the Navy Cross was lower in precedence than the Medal of Honor and the Navy Distinguished Service Medal, because it was awarded for both combat heroism and for "other distinguished service". Congress revised this on 7 August 1942, making the Navy Cross a combat-only decoration that follows the Medal of Honor in order of precedence. Since the medal was established, it has been awarded more than 6,300 times. It was designed by James Earle Fraser. Since the 11 September 2001 attacks the Navy Cross has been awarded 47 times, with two of them having the name of the recipient held in secret. One of those secret awardings was due to Marine Gunnery Sergeant Tate Jolly's  actions during the 2012 Benghazi attack.

Criteria

The Navy Cross may be awarded to any member of the U.S. Armed Forces while serving with the Navy, Marine Corps, or Coast Guard (when a part of the Department of the Navy) who distinguishes themselves in action by extraordinary heroism not justifying an award of the Medal of Honor. The action must take place under one of three circumstances:
 In combat action while engaged against an enemy of the United States; or,
 In combat action while engaged in military operations involving conflict with an opposing foreign force; or, 
 In combat action while serving with friendly foreign forces, who are engaged in armed conflict in which the United States is not a belligerent party.

The act(s) to be commended must be performed in the presence of great danger, or at great personal risk, and must be performed in such a manner as to render the individual's action(s) highly conspicuous among others of equal grade, rate, experience, or position of responsibility. An accumulation of minor acts of heroism does not justify an award of the Navy Cross.

As originally authorized, the Navy Cross could be awarded for distinguished non-combat acts, but legislation of 7 August 1942 limited the award to acts of combat heroism. Past Navy Cross awards for merit, such as to 9th Chief of Naval Operations Fleet Admiral Ernest King, were unaffected by the change in criteria.

Wear
The Navy Cross originally was the Navy's third-highest decoration, after the Medal of Honor and the Navy Distinguished Service Medal. On 7 August 1942, Congress revised the order of precedence, placing the Navy Cross above the Distinguished Service Medal in precedence. Since that time, the Navy Cross has been worn after the Medal of Honor and before all other awards.

Additional awards of the Navy Cross are denoted by gold or silver  inch stars affixed to the suspension and service ribbon of the medal. A gold star would be issued for each of the second through fifth awards, to be replaced by a silver star which would indicate a sixth award.  To date no one has received more than five awards.

Description and symbolism
 Medal
Obverse:
The medal is a modified cross pattée one and a half inches wide. The ends of its arms are rounded whereas a conventional cross patée has arms that are straight on the end. There are four laurel leaves with berries in each of the re-entrant arms of the cross. In the center of the cross, a sailing vessel is depicted on waves, sailing to the viewer's left. The vessel is a symbolic caravel of the type used between 1480 and 1500. Fraser selected the caravel because it was a symbol often used by the Naval Academy and because it represented both naval service and the tradition of the sea. The laurel leaves with berries refer to achievement.

Reverse:
In the center of the medal, a bronze cross pattée, one and a half inches wide, are crossed anchors from the pre-1850 period, with cables attached. The letters USN are evident amid the anchors.

The earliest version of the Navy Cross (1919–1928) featured a more narrow strip of white, while the so-called "Black Widow" medals awarded from 1941 to 1942 were notable for the dark color due to over-anodized finish. The medal is similar in appearance to the British Distinguished Service Cross.

 Service Ribbon
The service ribbon is navy blue with a center stripe of white identical to the suspension ribbon of the medal. The blue alludes to naval service; the white represents the purity of selflessness.

Notable recipients

United States Navy

 Samuel Adams (naval officer) (three awards)
 James Thomas Alexander, 35th Naval Governor of Guam
 Adelbert Althouse, 27th and 29th Naval Governor of Guam
 Jackson D. Arnold
 Barry K. Atkins
 William B. Ault
 Bernard L. Austin, (two awards)
 John Arnold Austin, namesake of 
 Matthew Axelson
 Edward L. Beach Jr.
 Richard Halsey Best
 Claude C. Bloch
 John Bradley
 William F. Bringle
 Robert P. Briscoe
 William H. Brockman Jr.
 Phil H. Bucklew (two awards)
 John D. Bulkeley (also a Medal of Honor (MOH) and 2 Army Distinguished Service Crosses (DSC)s)
 Arleigh A. Burke
 Richard E. Byrd (also an MOH)
 Robert Carney
 Charles P. Cecil (two awards), namesake of 
 Gordon Pai'ea Chung-Hoon
 Bernard A. Clarey (three awards)
 George Thomas Coker
 James J. Connell
 Richard L. Conolly
 Walter W. Coolbaugh, namesake of 
 Ralph W. Cousins
 William P. Cronan, 19th Naval Governor of Guam
 William Michael Crose, 7th Governor of American Samoa
 Randy "Duke" Cunningham
 Winfield Scott Cunningham
 Maurice E. Curts
 Slade Cutter (four awards)
 Roy M. Davenport (five awards)
 Albert David (two awards and an MOH)
 Arthur C. Davis, (three awards)
 Samuel David Dealey (four awards, an Army DSC and an MOH)
 James Charles Dempsey, (two awards)
 Dieter Dengler
 Clarence E. Dickinson, (three awards)
 Danny Dietz
 Glynn R. "Donc" Donaho (four awards)
 Mark L. Donald
 William P. Driscoll
 Thomas M. Dykers, (two awards)
 Laurance T. DuBose, (three awards)
 Thomas Eadie (two awards and an MOH)
 Henry E. Eccles
 Richard S. Edwards
 Joseph F. Enright
 Harry D. Felt
 William Charles Fitzgerald namesake of 
 Eugene B. Fluckey (four awards and an MOH)
 Luis Fonsecai
 James Shepherd Freeman
 Neldon Theo French namesake of 
 Ignatius J. Galantin
 William Gilmer, 22nd and 24th Naval Governor of Guam
 George William Grider, U.S. Representitve to the 89th Congress
 Robert Halperin
 Robert W. Hayler (three awards), namesake of 
 Arthur Ray Hawkins (three awards)
 Henry Kent Hewitt (two awards)
 Lenah H. Sutcliffe Higbee, (first female recipient), namesake of 
 William A. Hodgman, 23rd Naval Governor of Guam
 Gilbert C. Hoover, (three awards)
 John Howard Hoover
 Frederick J. Horne
 John Howard
 Royal E. Ingersoll
 Jonas H. Ingram (also an MOH)
 Richard H. Jackson                           
 Edward C. Kalbfus
 Draper Kauffman (two awards)
 Joseph P. Kennedy, Jr. (member of the Kennedy family and brother of the 35th U.S. President
 Ernest J. King, 9th Chief of Naval Operations, one of four WWII Fleet admirals and namesake of 
 Thomas B. Klakring (three awards)
 Norman Jack "Dusty" Kleiss 
 Hugo W. Koehler
 Edmond Konrad (two awards)
 George Landenberger, 23rd Governor of American Samoa
 John H. Lang
 Harris Laning
 William D. Leahy one of four WWII Fleet Admirals and namesake of 
 Gatewood Lincoln, 22nd Governor of American Samoa
 Elliott Loughlin (two awards)
 Marcus Luttrell
 Harold John Mack
 John S. McCain Sr.
 David McCampbell (also an MOH)
 Benjamin McCandlish, 36th Naval Governor of Guam
 Pete McCloskey
 John McCloy (also two MOH)
 C. Wade McClusky
 Donald L. McFaul
 Charles H. McMorris, namesake of 
 Luke McNamee, 10th and 12th Naval Governor of Guam, and 21st Director of the Office of Naval Intelligence
 Doris "Dorie" Miller (first African American recipient), namesake of 
 Marc Mitscher (three awards)
 John Anderson Moore (three awards)
 Dudley W. "Mush" Morton, (four awards)
 Jesse W. Naul Jr. (also two Distinguished Flying Crosses (DFC)s) 
 Louis McCoy Nulton
 Edward "Butch" O'Hare (also an MOH)
 Richard H. "Dick" O'Kane, (three awards and an MOH)
 Chick Parsons (two awards)
 Edwin Taylor Pollock
 John Martin Poyer, 12th Governor of American Samoa
 Lawson P. Ramage (two awards and an MOH)
 DeWitt Clinton Ramsey
 Joseph M. Reeves
 George S. Rentz, namesake of 
 Frederick Lois Riefkohl
 Samuel B. Roberts
 Samuel Robison
 Dean Rockwell
 Maurice H. Rindskopf
 Tony F. Schneider, (two awards)
 Frank Herman Schofield
 David F. Sellers
 Benedict J. Semmes, Jr.
 Forrest P. Sherman
 Rodger W. Simpson (two awards)
 Harold Page Smith
 Charles P. Snyder
 Raymond A. Spruance
 David S. Stear
 Giles C. Stedman
 George L. Street, III (also an MOH)
 Felix Stump (two awards)
 John Thach (two awards)
 Robert J. Thomas
 John H. Towers
 Charles R. Train
 Richmond K. Turner
 Frank B. Upham
 Stanley W. Vejtasa, (three awards) also a USN fighter ace
 Corydon M. Wassell
 Ivan Wettengel, 25th Naval Governor of Guam
 James E. Williams, (also an MOH and two Silver Stars)
 Adam Williams (awarded as Adam William Berg)
 Royce Williams 
 Harry E. Yarnell

United States Marine Corps

 Robert H. Barrow (also an Army Distinguished Service Cross (DSC))
 John Basilone (also a Medal of Honor (MOH)), namesake of 
 Victor Bleasdale (two awards and an Army DSC)
 John F. Bolt
 Gregory "Pappy" Boyington (also an MOH)
 Martin Brandtner (two awards)
 James Carson Breckinridge
 Marion Eugene Carl (two awards)
 Evans Carlson (three awards)
 Clifton B. Cates (also two Army DSCs)
 Brian Chontosh
 George R. Christmas
 Julius Cogswell, (also an Army DSC)
 Alfred A. Cunningham
 William H. Dabney
 Joseph W. Dailey
 Daniel Daly (also two MOHs and an Army DSC)
 Ray Davis (also an MOH)
 James Devereux
 William A. Eddy
 Merritt A. Edson (two awards and an MOH
 Raymond Frybarger, Jr., namesake of 
 Guy Gabaldon
 Patrick “Bob” Gallagher
 Roy Geiger (two awards)
 Herman H. Hanneken (two awards and an MOH)
 Robert M. Hanson (also an MOH)
 Myron Harrington, Jr.
 Leo D. Hermle (also an Army DSC)
 Thomas Holcomb 	
 Edward Buist Hope, (also an Army DSC)
 Henry L. Hulbert (also an MOH and an Army DSC)
 George Victor Jmaeff
 Bradley Kasal
 Treddy Ketcham
 Victor H. Krulak
 Henry Louis Larsen (two awards)
 Kurt Chew-Een Lee
 Justin LeHew
 William K. MacNulty
 Victor Maghakian
 William Edward Campbell March
 Karl Marlantes
 John McNulty (U.S. Marine Corps) (also an Army DSC)
 Raymond Murray (two awards and an Army DSC)
 Peter J. Ortiz (two awards)
 Rafael Peralta
 Edwin A. Pollock
 Lewis "Chesty" Puller, (five awards and an Army DSC)
 Paul A. Putnam
 John H. Quick (also an MOH and an Army DSC)
 Kenneth L. Reusser (two awards)
 John Ripley
 Harold C. Roberts (three awards)
 Ford O. Rogers
 James Roosevelt
 William H. Rupertus
 John H. Russell, Jr.
 Al Schmid
 Harry Schmidt
 Harold G. Schrier 
 Lemuel C. Shepherd, Jr. (also an Army DSC)
 Robert Taplett
 Alexander Vandegrift (also an MOH)
 Lew Walt (two awards)
 Jim Webb
 John H. Yancey (two awards)
 George Yarborough, namesake of 
 Jeremiah Workman

United States Army

 Stephen J. Chamberlin
 Rex T. Barber
 Thomas George Lanphier, Jr.
 John W. Mitchell
 John U.D. Page

United States Coast Guard

 Frederick C. Billard
 Raymond Evans
 Elmer Fowler Stone
Philip F. Roach

Non-U.S. recipients

 Nikolai Basistiy, Soviet Union (Soviet Navy, 1943)
 Gordon Bridson, New Zealand (Royal New Zealand Navy, 1943)
 Ernesto Burzagli, Italy (Royal Italian Navy, 1919)
 Harold Farncomb, Australia (Royal Australian Navy, 1945)
 Donald Gilbert Kennedy, New Zealand (British Solomon Islands Protectorate Defence Force, 1945)
 Israel Fisanovich, Soviet Union (Soviet Navy, 1944)
 Émile Henry Muselier, France (Free French Naval Forces, 1919)
 Peter Phipps, New Zealand (Royal New Zealand Navy, 1943)
 Ronald Niel Stuart, first Royal Navy officer to receive both the American Navy Cross and the British Victoria Cross (Royal Navy, 1927)
 Tran Van Bay, South Vietnam (Army of the Republic of Vietnam, 1967)
 Nguyen Van Kiet, South Vietnam (Republic of Vietnam Navy, 1972)
 , Soviet Union (Soviet Navyn, 1944)

See also
 Military awards and decorations
 Military awards of the United States Department of the Navy
 List of recipients of the Navy Cross in the Vietnam War

Notes

References

Further reading
 SECNAVINST 1650.1H 2006 2–22 Page 57

External links

 Navy Cross – Criteria, Background, and Images

Awards and decorations of the United States Coast Guard
Awards and decorations of the United States Marine Corps
Awards and decorations of the United States Navy
Awards established in 1919
Courage awards
Works by James Earle Fraser (sculptor)